Heaven Is for Real is a 2014 American Christian drama film written and directed by Randall Wallace and co-written by Christopher Parker, based on Pastor Todd Burpo and Lynn Vincent's 2010 book of the same name. The film stars Greg Kinnear, Kelly Reilly, Connor Corum, Margo Martindale, and Thomas Haden Church.

The film has received mixed critical reviews, but nevertheless was a box office success, grossing $101 million against a $12 million budget, becoming the second-highest grossing Christian film of all time.

Plot
Four-year-old Colton Burpo is the son of Todd Burpo, pastor of Crossroads Wesleyan Church in Imperial, Nebraska. Colton says he experienced Heaven during an emergency surgery after having acute appendicitis. He describes to his incredulous family about having seen the surgeon operating on his ruptured appendix, his mother calling people in the waiting room to pray, and his father in another room yelling at God to not let him die. He also speaks of incidents with people he never met or knew about: meeting a great-grandfather who had died long before he was born, an unborn sister he never knew about who had died in a miscarriage, and having met Jesus.

Colton speaks about his experiences in Heaven, and Todd is faced with the dilemma of determining the legitimacy of his son's experience. Todd's wariness about discussing the situation erodes the confidence of the board members of his church, and he is contacted by several members of the media. When Todd is called by a radio station for an impromptu on-air interview, he invites them to attend his sermon the following Sunday. At church, he preaches about his son's experiences and reveals his support for him.

Following the events at the church, Todd is doing research on the Internet and finds a story about a Lithuanian girl who had a similar experience. Her recall of Jesus was identical to that of Colton. Todd tries to speak to Colton further about the experience but he is interrupted by his wife revealing that she is pregnant with their third child. Photos of Colton and his family are shown in the present day.

Cast
 Connor Corum as Colton Burpo
 Greg Kinnear as Todd Burpo, a small-town pastor in Nebraska
 Kelly Reilly as Sonja Burpo, Burpo's wife
 Lane Styles as Cassie Burpo, Burpo's daughter and Colton's sister
 Margo Martindale as Nancy Rawling
 Thomas Haden Church as Jay Wilkins
 Mike Mohrhardt as Jesus
 Ali Tataryn as Angel
 Ina Barron as Angel
 Jacob Vargas as Michael
 Nancy Sorel as Dr. Charlotte Slater
 Danso Gordon as Ray
 Darcy Fehr as Lee Watson
 Amber Lynn Partridge as The Zookeeper
 Kevin Anderson as Mr. Baxter

Production and development
In May 2011, Sony Pictures acquired the film rights of the book Heaven Is for Real. It was announced that Joe Roth would be producing the film with T. D. Jakes for the TriStar Pictures division of Sony Pictures. On August 23, 2012, Braveheart writer and Secretariat director Randall Wallace signed on to direct.

On March 19, 2013, it was announced that Greg Kinnear was in talks to star, and he later joined the cast. On April 15, 2013, actress Kelly Reilly joined the film.

On July 17, it was reported that composer Nick Glennie-Smith would score the film, and behind the scenes, the director of photography was Dean Semler.

Shooting began in the last week of July 2013 in Selkirk, Manitoba.

Release
The film was released on April 16, 2014 and held a 3,048 theater count through its 4th week.

Reception

Box office
At the end of box office run, Heaven Is for Real earned a gross of $91,443,253 in North America and $9,026,536 in other territories for a worldwide total of $100,469,789 against a budget of $12 million.

The film grossed $3.7 million on its opening day. It went on to gross a total of $22.5 million in its opening weekend, playing in 2,417 theaters for a $9,318 per-theatre average finishing in second behind Captain America: The Winter Soldier.

The biggest markets in other territories were Mexico, Poland, and Colombia where the film grossed $1.9 million, $1.4 million, and $1.2 million, respectively.

Critical response
Heaven Is for Real received mixed reviews. The film holds a 51% rating on the film aggregator website Rotten Tomatoes, based on 89 reviews, with an average score of 5.6/10. The site's consensus states, "Heaven Is for Real boasts a well-written screenplay and a talented cast, but overextends itself with heavy-handed sequences depicting concepts it could have trusted the audience to take on faith." On another website, Metacritic, it has a 47/100 score (indicating "mixed or average"), based on reviews from 27 critics.

In CinemaScore polls conducted during the opening weekend, cinema audiences gave the film an average grade of "A" on an A+ to F scale.

Jeb Lund, a columnist for The Guardian, expressed skepticism about the depiction of the story in the film. The red markers which Colton Burpo claims Jesus had on his hands and feet are well known. The boy could have easily guessed that his minister father would have been praying, or nursing staff could have told him.

Accolades

See also
Akiane
Miracles from Heaven (film)
Breakthrough (2019 film)

References

External links
 
 
 
 
 

2014 films
2014 independent films
American independent films
Films scored by Nick Glennie-Smith
Films about children
Affirm Films films
Films about Christianity
Films about evangelicalism
Films based on non-fiction books
Films directed by Randall Wallace
Films produced by Joe Roth
Films set in Nebraska
Films shot in Winnipeg
Heaven and hell films
Heaven in popular culture
Fiction about near-death experiences
Portrayals of Jesus in film
TriStar Pictures films
2014 drama films
2010s English-language films
2010s American films